The 1983 Invercargill mayoral election was held on 8 October 1983 as part of the 1983 New Zealand local elections, and was conducted under the First Past the Post system.

After her loss at the previous election, former deputy mayor Eve Poole defeated incumbent councillors John Russell and Jim Fenton, thus becoming the first female Mayor of Invercargill.

Results
The following table gives the election results:

References

1983 elections in New Zealand
Mayoral elections in Invercargill
October 1983 events in New Zealand